Jakub (or Jakob) Schikaneder (February 27, 1855 in Prague – November 15, 1924 in Prague) was a painter from Bohemia.

Biography 
Jakub (or Jakob) Schikaneder was born to a family of a German customs office clerk in Prague. The family's love of art enabled him to pursue his studies, despite bad economic circumstances. The aspiring painter was an descendant of Urban Schikaneder, the elder brother of librettist Emanuel Schikaneder. 

After having completed his studies in Prague and Munich (1871–1879), the latter under the guidance of his teacher Gabriel von Max, Schikaneder along with Emanuel Krescenc Liška was involved in the furnishing of the royal box in the National Theatre in Prague. However, this work was lost in a fire in 1881.

Following his work in the National Theatre, Schikaneder traveled through Europe, visiting Germany, England, Scotland, The Netherlands, Switzerland, Italy and France. From 1891 until 1923 he taught in Prague's Art College. Schikaneder counted amongst those who admired the Munich School of the end of the 19th century.

He died in 1924 and was buried in Vinohrady Cemetery in Prague.

Work 
Schikaneder is known for his soft paintings of the outdoors, often lonely in mood. His paintings often feature poor and outcast figures and "combined neoromantic and naturalist impulses." Other motifs favoured by Schikaneder were autumn and winter, corners and alleyways in the city of Prague and the banks of the Vltava – often in the early evening light, or cloaked in mist. His first well-known work was the monumental painting Repentance of the Lollards (2.5m × 4m, lost). The National Gallery in Prague held an exhibition of his paintings from May 1998 until January 1999.

Selected works

References

Further reading 
 : Schikaneder: Jakub Schikaneder, Prague painter of the turn of the century ("A thematic guide to a retrospective exhibition, National Gallery in Prague, Collection of Old Masters, Wallenstein Riding School in Prague, May 15, 1998 – January 10, 1999"). Prague: National Gallery, 1998.

External links 

  Radio Prague – extensive Biography
 Exhibition titled "Jakub Schikaneder: Master of moods and melancholic poetry" at Adolf Loos Apartment and Gallery

19th-century Austrian painters
19th-century Austrian male artists
Austrian male painters
20th-century Austrian painters
German Bohemian people
Artists from Prague
1855 births
1924 deaths
20th-century Austrian male artists